Trn is a village in the municipality of Velika Kladuša, Bosnia and Herzegovina.

Demographics 
According to the 2013 census, its population was 376.

References

Populated places in Velika Kladuša